Jale (also spelled Jaleh, or Zhaleh) is a common given name and surname of Persian and  Turkish origin, used in Iran and Turkey, meaning hail stone. Notable people with the name include:

Jale

Given name
 Jale Arıkan (born 1965), Turkish-German actress
 Jale Aylanç (1948–2020), Turkish actress
 Jale Bainisika (1914/1915–2020), Fijian military office
 Jale Birsel (1927–2019), Turkish actress
 Jale İnan (1914–2001), Turkish archaeologist
 Jale Vakaloloma (born 1996), Fijian rugby union player
 Jale Yılmabaşar (born 1939), Turkish painter and ceramicist.

Middle name
 Elif Jale Yeşilırmak (born 1986), Turkish wrestler of Russian origin

Surname
 Afife Jale (1902-1941), Turkish stage actress
 Anare Jale (born c. 1949), Fijian civil servant
 Grace Jale (born 1999), New Zealand football player

Jaleh
 Jaleh Amouzgar (born 1939), Iranian historian
 Sane Jaleh (1985–2011), Iranian student protester

Zhaleh
 Zhaleh Kazemi (1944–2003), Iranian artist
 Zhaleh Olov (born 1927), Iranian actress

Iranian feminine given names
Turkish feminine given names